Hyposmocoma opuumaloo is a species of moth of the family Cosmopterigidae. It is endemic to Necker Island. The type locality is Flagpole Hill.

The wingspan is 8.9–9.1 mm.

The larval case is cone-shaped and 6.7–7.1 mm in length. It is small and thin and decorated with bits of sand woven with silk filaments. The operculum is decorated with small pebbles. The case background color ranges from gray to brown.

Adults were reared from case-making larvae. Larvae were collected on the ground.

External links
New species of Hyposmocoma (Lepidoptera, Cosmopterigidae) from the remote Northwestern Hawaiian Islands of Laysan, Necker, and Nihoa

opuumaloo
Endemic moths of Hawaii
Moths described in 2009